Romi Aboulafia is an Israeli actress, screenwriter and filmmaker.

Early life

Aboulafia was born in Tel Aviv, Israel, to a Sephardic Jewish family. She started acting at the age of six and was cast for a lead role in the award-winning Israel drama Shabatot VeHagim.

She was enlisted to as a soldier to the IDF Spokesperson's Unit.

Career

Acting
In 2010, she starred in John Madden’s The Debt alongside Helen Mirren, Jessica Chastain, and Sam Worthing. The film was released by Fox Searchlight Pictures in 2011. That year, she also starred in the Israeli LGBTQ cult indie Joe + Bell by director Veronica Kedar. In 2012, she starred in Nony Geffen's Not in Tel Aviv, which won the Jury Award at Locarno Film Festival, as well as in Endemol Shine’s strip-club-thriller Allenby. In 2014, she participated in the television series Very Important Man alongside Yehuda Levi, as well as starring in the German film Anderswo alongside her mother-in-law Hana Laszlo. In 2018, she starred in Endemol Shine’s Harem alongside Alon Abutbul.

Filmmaking
After her two years of mandatory army service, Aboulafia moved to the UK to study film. She earned a MFA from the London Film School and directed her thesis film Eyes, which was shot in Israel. Throughout her acting career she's also worked as a film editor.

In 2019, she began developing a television series for Endeavour Content with her husband Ben Giladi and Hagai Levi

Modeling
At the age of eighteen, Aboulafia became the first spokesmodel of Israeli fashion brand – Castro. Aboulafia presented the company for one season before deciding to leave the country to study film. Castro spokesmodels that followed include – Gal Gadot and Bar Refaeli.

Personal life

Aboulafia married Israeli film and television producer Ben Giladi in 2016. The two have a child together and live in London. She's the daughter-in-law of Israeli actress and comedian Hana Laszlo, sister-in-law of actor Mark Ivanir and the niece of television executive Orly Adelson.

References

External links 

Romi Aboulafia on Instagram

Year of birth missing (living people)
Living people
Actresses from Tel Aviv
Film people from Tel Aviv
Israeli film actresses
Israeli female screenwriters
Alumni of the London Film School
Israeli Sephardi Jews
Israeli Mizrahi Jews